The 23rd Battalion, also known as the Canterbury-Otago Battalion,  was an infantry battalion of the New Zealand Military Forces during the Second World War. Formed in November 1939 as part of the 5th Brigade, 2nd Division of the 2nd New Zealand Expeditionary Force. After undertaking training at Burnham Camp the battalion sailed from New Zealand on 1 May 1940. The battalion saw action in Greece, Crete, North Africa, and Italy.

History

Formation and training
Following the outbreak of the Second World War, the New Zealand government authorised the formation of the 2nd New Zealand Expeditionary Force (2NZEF), for service at home and abroad. Following consultation with the British government, it was decided that the main New Zealand contribution to the war effort would be in the form of an infantry division, the 2nd New Zealand Division, under the command of Major General Bernard Freyberg. The new division would require nine battalions of infantry and consequently, several infantry battalions were formed from 1939 to 1940 with New Zealand volunteers.

The 23rd Battalion, also known as the Canterbury-Otago Battalion, was formed in January 1940 under the command of Lieutenant Colonel A. S. Falconer. It was the last of three infantry battalions designated to make up the second echelon of the 2nd New Zealand Division, destined for overseas service. Its personnel were all volunteers were drawn from the South Island of New Zealand. They were formed into four rifle companies, designated A to D and corresponding to the Canterbury, Southland, Nelson/Marlborough/West Coast and Otago districts.

After completing rudimentary training, the battalion embarked for England in May 1940 as part of the 5th Infantry Brigade, 2nd New Zealand Division. Sailing on the transport Andes, they made port calls at Perth, in Australia, Cape Town, and Freetown before arriving at Gourock, in Scotland, in June. Following this, the battalion spent the remainder of the year on garrison duties in the south of England where they were positioned to respond in case of a cross-Channel invasion by the Germans in the wake of the Fall of France.

Commanding officers
The following officers served as commanding officer of 23rd Battalion:
 Lieutenant Colonel A. S. Falconer (January–August 1940; March–May 1941);
 Lieutenant Colonel D. F. Leckie (August 1940–March 1941; May–June 1941);
 Lieutenant Colonel R. E. Romans (June 1941; July 1942–April 1943; August–December 1943);
 Lieutenant Colonel C. N. Watson (June–July 1942);
 Lieutenant Colonel J. R. J. Connolly (April–May 1943; December 1943–May 1944);
 Lieutenant Colonel M. C. Fairbrother (May–August 1943);
 Lieutenant Colonel W. B. Thomas (December 1943; June–August 1944; October 1944–May 1945);
 Lieutenant Colonel E. D. Blundell (May 1944);
 Lieutenant Colonel E. A. McPhail (May–June 1944; August–October 1944);
 Lieutenant Colonel D. G. Grant (May–September 1945);
 Major D. P. W. Harvey (September–December 1945).

Notes
Footnotes

Citations

References

 

Infantry battalions of New Zealand in World War II
Military units and formations established in 1939
Military units and formations disestablished in 1945